Dadisho Qatraya or Dadisho of Qatar (late 7th century) was a Nestorian monk and author of ascetic literature in Syriac. His works were widely read, from Ethiopia to Central Asia.

Life
Dadisho flourished in the late 7th century. Originally from Beth Qatraye (eastern Arabia), he became attached first to the unidentified monastery of Rab-kennārē then later to those of Rabban Shabur (near Shushtar in Khuzestan) and of the Blessed Apostles. Nothing else about his life is known. Giuseppe Simone Assemani identified him with Dadisho of Mount Izla, who lived a century earlier. Addai Scher, however, demonstrated that there were two distinct individuals.

Works
He wrote extensively in Syriac. All of his writings are concerned with shelya (stillness). Among his surviving works are:
Treatise on Solitude, also called the Retreat of the Seven Weeks or the Seven Weeks of Solitude, which describes how a monk should retreat into complete solitude and prayer for seven weeks at a time
Letter to Mar Abkosh on Hesychia, also called On Stillness (i.e., hesychia)
Commentary on Abba Isaiah, which is a commentary on the Syriac version of the Asceticon of Isaiah of Scetis and describes shelya as the condition the soul must meet to reach God. All surviving manuscripts break off after the fifteenth discourse of Isaiah (out of twenty-six), but there are quotations from the rest of the work in a fragmentary commentary on Isaiah that was apparently a reworking of Dadisho's.
Commentary on the Paradise of the Fathers, which is a commentary on the Paradise of the Fathers of Enanisho in the form of a series of questions posed by some monks to their superior concerning the issues raised by the sayings of the Egyptian Fathers collected by Enanisho
He also wrote a few short work on similar ascetic themes. Both of his commentaries were translated into Arabic and Sogdian. Although only fragments of the latter survive, the Arabic version survives both complete and abridged and in both Arabic script and Garshuni. The Commentary on the Paradise was also translated from Arabic into Ethiopic. The Arabic version of the Abba Isaiah commentary describes Dadisho as a disciple of Isaac of Nineveh. These translations assured him a wide diffusion among the Oriental Orthodox. Dadisho is the earliest writer to credit an Egyptian monk, Mar Awgin (a figure he may have invented), with introducing monasticism to Mesopotamia in the 4th century.

Notes

Bibliography

7th-century Christian theologians
Church of the East writers
Syriac Christians
Syriac writers